Margaret Lillian Adams (born August 9, 1986), better known by her stage name Magibon, is an American Internet personality and YouTube celebrity on the video-sharing website YouTube.

Biography
Margaret Lillian Adams was born in Florida, but has lived in Pennsylvania as of 2008. Prior to her fame on YouTube, she learned to speak some Japanese phrases from watching Japanese television dramas, anime, and listening to Japanese music. She is not fluent in Japanese.

YouTube videos
As of the end of 2010, Magibon had uploaded nearly 100 videos onto her YouTube channel since July 2006. Almost all her videos are in the form of video blogs, or vlogs, lasting under one minute, with most of them just showing her smiling silently into the camera. In a few of her videos, Magibon speaks or sings in broken Japanese. When asked whether she planned making the videos, she replied "I don't use scripts. There's no grand plan."

Magibon is a fan of Morning Musume, especially of former-member Ai Kago. Ai Kago's nickname is Aibon, so -bon on magibon was taken from Ai Kago.

In some of her YouTube videos, Magibon introduces herself by saying "Minna-san, Konnichiwa! Magibon desu" (Hello, everyone, I'm Magibon). After saying this, she remains quiet until the end of the video, where she says "Bye bye".

Japanese media coverage
In Japan, Magibon has drawn comparisons for extreme similarity with Leah Dizon. In addition to appearing on a TBS Radio show in Japan, Magibon has been featured in the Japanese Weekly Playboy magazine, appearing in the February 25, 2008, April 14, 2008, 12/19 May 2008 and November 10, 2008 issues.

In April 2008, Magibon was invited to be interviewed by the Japanese Internet TV company GyaO and flown to Japan to make her debut appearance on internet TV program Midtown TV in which she met her idol, Mari Yaguchi of Hello! Project.  A fan event was scheduled for April 12, 2008 by USEN (the owner of GyaO), but this was canceled due to security concerns following the receipt of a number of threatening emails.

In October 2008, Magibon was invited to the 21st Tokyo International Film Festival, and appeared at the world premiere of the film Blue Symphony in Roppongi on October 22, 2008. Magibon featured as a voice actress in the film.

Magibon returned to Japan in November 2008, appearing at the "YouTube Live Tokyo" event at Studio Coast in Tokyo on November 23 alongside other YouTube personalities and musicians such as BoA and Kreva.

See also
 List of YouTubers

References

External links
 Magibon's new blog
 Magibon's Yahoo blog 
 PingMag Interview 

1986 births
Living people
People from West Palm Beach, Florida
American YouTubers
YouTube vloggers